Irene Hunt (February 22, 1892 – October 13, 1988) was an American film actress of the silent era. She appeared in 120 films between 1911 and 1926. She was born in New York, New York, and died in Paso Robles, California.

Although she performed primarily in dramatic films, she also acted in Westerns and action films.

Partial filmography

 Almost a Rescue (1913)
 The Life of General Villa (1914)
 The Mountain Rat (1914)
 The Penitentes (1915)
 The Outlaw's Revenge (1915)
 Heart Strings (1917)
 The Stainless Barrier (1917)
 The Birth of Patriotism (1917)
 The Hand at the Window (1918)
 Cinderella's Twin (1920)
 Moon Madness (1920)
 The Big Punch (1921)
 Oliver Twist, Jr. (1921)
 The Last Card (1921)
 The Crimson Challenge (1922)
 Forget Me Not (1922)
 Pawn Ticket 210 (1922)
 Hearts Aflame (1923)
 The Eternal Three (1923)
 The Dramatic Life of Abraham Lincoln (1924) as Nancy Hanks Lincoln
 The Foolish Virgin (1924)
 The Phantom of the Forest (1926)

References

External links

1892 births
1988 deaths
Actresses from New York City
American film actresses
American silent film actresses
20th-century American actresses
Western (genre) film actresses